Antonio Kovačević (born 21 May 1987) is a Croatian handball player who plays for Csurgói KK and the Croatian national team.

He competed at the 2016 European Men's Handball Championship.

References

1987 births
Living people
Croatian male handball players
Handball players from Zagreb
RK Zagreb players
21st-century Croatian people